Eleven ships of the French Navy have borne the name Bellone, in honour of Bellona:
  (1690–1696), a galley
  (1696–1719), a 32-gun frigate
  (1745–1749), a 30-gun frigate
  (1758–1777), a 32-gun frigate
  (1779–1806), a 32-gun 
  (1797–1797), a xebec
  (1807–1817), a 44-gun frigate
  (1808), a ship of unknown type
 Bellone (1814–1840), a 44-gun 
  (1853–1877), a 38-gun frigate

Privateers 
Several French privateers also bore the name.
 Bellone, involved in a naval battle in Loch nan Uamh during the Jacobite rising. She was captured in 1747 and taken into Royal Navy service as HMS Bellona and was sold in 1749.
 Bellone, of 34-guns under Jacques François Perroud ,  which captured the East Indiaman  on 14 August 1803 . A painting by Auguste Mayer commemorates the action.

French Navy ship names